Adil Hadi al Jazairi Bin Hamlili is a citizen of Algeria who was held in extrajudicial detention in the United States Guantanamo Bay detainment camps, in Cuba. The US Department of Defense reports that Bin Hamlili was born on 26 June 1976, in Oram (Oran)  Algeria. His Guantanamo Internment Serial Number was 1452.

The interrogators in Guantanamo Bay believed Bin Hamlili was an Al Qaeda financier and assassin who also worked for the British Intelligence Service MI6 and the Canadian Intelligence Service CSIS.

Identity

Adil Hadi al Jazairi Bin Hamlili's name was spelled inconsistently on various documents released by the United States Department of Defense:

Adil Hadial Al Jazairi Bin Hamlili on the Summary of Evidence memo prepared for his Combatant Status Review Tribunal, on 16 November 2004.
Adil Hadi Al-Jaza'iri Bin Hamlili on the Summary of Evidence memo prepared for his first and second annual Administrative Review Board, on 25 August 2005 and on 7 September 2006.

Combatant Status Review Tribunal
A Summary of Evidence memo was prepared for
Adil Hadial Al Jazairi Bin Hamlili's
Combatant Status Review Tribunal,
on
16 November 2004.
The memo listed the following allegations against him:

There is no record that Bin Hamlili participated in his Combatant Status Review Tribunal.

Administrative Review Board hearing

First annual Administrative Review Board

A Summary of Evidence memo was prepared for
Adil Hadi Al-Jaza'iri Bin Hamlili's first annual
Administrative Review Board,
on
25 August 2005.
The memo was published in September 2007.
It listed 44 "primary factors favoring continued detention", and 2 "primary factors favoring release or transfer".

Transcript

Bin Hamlili participated in his first annual Administrative Review Board.

Second annual Administrative Review Board

A Summary of Evidence memo was prepared for
Adil Hadi Al-Jaza'iri Bin Hamlili's
second annual
Administrative Review Board,
on
7 September 2006.
The memo was published in September 2007.
It listed 44 "primary factors favoring continued detention", and 9 "primary factors favoring release or transfer".

Guantanamo Medical records

On 16 March 2007 the Department of Defense published medical records for the captives.
According to those records Adil Hadi bin Hamlili
was 68 inches tall.
According to those records his weight was recorded 29 times between September 2004 and December 2006.
According to those records his weight ranged from 151 to 203 pounds.
Those records indicated he gained 29 pounds between 20 September 2005 and 22 September.
Those records indicated he lost 45 pounds between 11 and 17 July 2006.

Habeas corpus petition

Bin Hamlily had a habeas corpus petition filed on his behalf in 2005.
The Department of Defense published documents from the CSR Tribunals of 179 captives; they did not publish any of his habeas documents.

Military Commissions Act

The Military Commissions Act of 2006 mandated that Guantanamo captives were no longer entitled to access the US civil justice system, so all outstanding habeas corpus petitions were stayed.

Boumediene v. Bush

On 12 June 2008, the United States Supreme Court ruled, in Boumediene v. Bush, that the Military Commissions Act could not remove the right for Guantanamo captives to access the US Federal Court system.  All previous Guantanamo captives' habeas petitions were eligible to be re-instated.

Habeas corpus re-initiated

Bin Hamlily's attorney's filed requests to re-initiate his habeas petition.
According to a status report filed on 18 July 2008, bin Hamlily was captured in June 2003;
Bin Hamliy was held for ten months in US custody in Kabul;
Bin Hamliy was held for three to four months in the Bagram Theater Internment Facility;
Bin Hamlily was transferred to Guantanamo in 2004;

Fellow Guantanamo captive Shaker Aamer initiated the petition on 15 April 2005.
On 19 June 2007, his attorneys filed a Petition for Immediate Release (DTA) under the Detainee Treatment Act – Hamlily v. Gates – 07-1225.
On 1 July 2008, his attorneys filed an "Amended Petition for Writ of Habeas Corpus".

The Government has not filed a "factual return" in his habeas petition. However, they have filed some response to his DTA petition.transferred to Guantanamo in 2004.

Return to Algeria

Adil Hadi al Jazairi Bin Hamlili and Hasan Zemiri were repatriated to Algeria on 20 January 2010. Carol Rosenberg, writing in the Miami Herald, reported that it was not clear whether the two men had been sent home as free men, or whether they were transferred to Algerian custody. She noted that two other Algerians had been granted asylum, in France, as they had reason to fear a return home.

His lawyer Clive Stafford Smith reported that in 2009, Hamlili was cleared by the Obama administration's review procedure, reflecting a finding that he was "no threat to the US or its coalition partners."  With this finding, Hamlili was returned to Algeria on 20 January 2010, as a free man. Clive Stafford Smith said that Hamlili has suffered from a psychotic disorder, and other mental disabilities provoked by alleged abuse in US custody.

In Algeria, Hamlili was tried on terrorism charges but acquitted on 21 February 2010.

References

External links

 "Algeria court acquits former Gitmo inmate", Kuwait News Agency, 21 February 2010
 Two Algerian Torture Victims Are Freed from Guantánamo Andy Worthington

Algerian extrajudicial prisoners of the United States
Living people
1976 births
Guantanamo detainees known to have been released
People subject to extraordinary rendition by the United States
Algerian torture victims
People from Oran
Algerian expatriates in Pakistan